Nunuku-whenua was a Moriori chief who is known for being a sixteenth-century pacifist.

The Moriori, a Polynesian people, migrated to the then-uninhabited Chatham Islands from mainland New Zealand around the year 1500. Following an intertribal conflict, Nunuku-whenua, a prominent Moriori chief of the Hamata tribe, established "Nunuku's Law", which forbade war, cannibalism and murder.

Moriori obeyed Nunuku's Law strictly, and maintained peace in the Chathams until 1835, when about 900 Māori from two North Island iwi, the Ngāti Mutunga and the Ngāti Tama, arrived in the Chathams. The invaders had guns and massacred the Moriori, who gathered urgently for a council at Te Awapātiki. Although youths argued in favour of armed resistance, elders ruled that Nunuku's Law could not be violated for any reason. The Moriori population, conquered and  enslaved, fell from over 1600 in 1835 to less than 100 within thirty years.

Notes

References
 

Moriori people
New Zealand pacifists
Cannibalism in Oceania
16th-century New Zealand people
People from the Chatham Islands
Pacifism in New Zealand